Sean O'Hearn (born June 11, 1998) is an American professional soccer player who plays as a defender for USL League One club One Knoxville SC.

Career

Youth, College & Amateur
O'Hearn played with USSDA side PA Classics from 2011, before going to play college soccer at Georgetown University in 2017. O'Hearn played three full seasons with the Hoyas, making 62 appearances and as a rookie was named to the Big East All-Freshman Team. The Big East season was cancelled in 2020 due to the COVID-19 pandemic.

Whilst at college, O'Hearn played with USL League Two side North County United during their 2018 season.

Professional
On November 30, 2020, it was announced that O'Hearn had signed with USL League One side New England Revolution II ahead of their 2021 season. On January 21, 2021, O'Hearn was drafted 38th overall in the 2021 MLS SuperDraft by Minnesota United. However, he was not signed by Minnesota and remained with New England. His MLS rights were later traded to Toronto FC in March 2022.

On April 10, 2021, O'Hearn made his professional debut, starting against Fort Lauderdale CF in a 1–0 win.

On December 29, 2022, O'Hearn signed with USL League One side One Knoxville SC.

References

External links
Sean O'Hearn at Georgetown Athletics

1998 births
Living people
American soccer players
Association football defenders
Georgetown Hoyas men's soccer players
Minnesota United FC draft picks
MLS Next Pro players
New England Revolution II players
People from Lancaster, Pennsylvania
Soccer players from Pennsylvania
Sportspeople from Lancaster, Pennsylvania
Treasure Coast Tritons players
United States men's youth international soccer players
USL League One players
USL League Two players